Agonum placidum is a species of black coloured ground beetle in the Platyninae subfamily that can be found in woodlands, thickets, and open fields of southern Canada and northeastern United States.

References

External links
Agonum placidum on Bug Guide
Agonum placidum on Encyclopedia of Life

Beetles described in 1823
placidum
Beetles of North America